The 2007 WPS Bathurst 12 Hour was an  Australian endurance race for Production Cars, held over a twelve-hour period starting from 5:45am on 8 April 2007 at the Mount Panorama Circuit, Bathurst, New South Wales. It was the fifth Bathurst 12 Hour race and the first to be staged since 1994. It was also the opening round of the 2007 Australian Production Car Championship.

The race was open to Group 3E Series Production Cars and to invited cars not eligible under Group 3E, but otherwise subject to compliance with Group 3E specifications. These included Tarmac Rally Cars built to Modern Tarmac Rally Spec Rules and cars that had competed in the Australian Performance Car Championship and the Australian Production Car Championship in the last five years. After 257 laps and 1596 kilometres of racing, Garry Holt, Paul Morris and Craig Baird claimed victory in a BMW 335i, finishing a minute and 18 seconds ahead of the Subaru Impreza WRX STi of rally drivers Chris Atkinson, Dean Herridge and Cody Crocker.

Class structure
Cars competed in the following classes:
 Class A : Penrite Rear Wheel Drive Performance Cars
 Class B : Sonax All Wheel Drive Performance Cars
 Class C : APCC Hot Hatches
 Class D : APCC Production Sports and Touring Sedans
 Class E : APCC Production Hatch and Sedans
 Class F : APCC Production Micro Sports and Coupes
 Class G : Eco Diesel Over 3.5 Litre
 Class H : Eco Diesel 3.5 Litres and Under

Results

Fastest lap was 2m32.5945s, recorded by Car 20 when driven by Craig Baird.

References

External links
 Images from the 2007 WPS Bathurst 12 Hour at www.pbase.com
 2007 WPS 12 Hour Race Final Results at www.bimf.com.au via web.archive.org

Motorsport in Bathurst, New South Wales
WPS Bathurst 12 Hour